The Speaker of the National Assembly (Urdu: اسپیکر قومی اسمبلی); informally as Speaker National Assembly, is the presiding official of the National Assembly of Pakistan– a lower house of the Parliament of Pakistan.

The office has its roots in 1947 and was reestablished in 1973 in accordance to the Constitution; the speaker presides over the chamber composed of people's representatives elected on the basis of universal franchise. The Speaker is Second in the line of succession to the President of Pakistan and occupies fourth position in the Warrant of Precedence, after the President, the Prime Minister and the Chairman of Senate. In addition, the Speaker is the spokesman of the National Assembly to the outside world, and is non-partisan in his approach.

To exercise the great authority that stems from the respect, affection and consideration which every Member of the House bestows upon the holder of this high office, the Speaker shows complete impartiality in the discharge of his or her functions. The speakers continues to serve until a new speaker is elected when the National Assembly dissolves.

Role and responsibilities

The office of Speaker of the National Assembly is created by Article 53 of the Chapter 2 in Part III of the Constitution of Pakistan:

The Speakership of the National Assembly is a leadership position and the office-holder actively works to set the majority party's legislative agenda. The Speaker usually does not personally preside over debates, instead delegating the duty to members of the House from the majority party. The Speaker usually does not participate in debate and rarely votes.

History 

The first Speaker/President of the National Assembly of Pakistan, Muhammad Ali Jinnah was elected unanimously by the Constituent Assembly of Pakistan on 11 August 1947. He served from 11 August until his death on 11 September 1948. The Deputy President of the Constituent Assembly, Maulvi Tamizuddin Khan was then elected president who served two separate terms in that capacity. Only two speakers in the history of Pakistan have gone on to become Prime Ministers, Zulfikar Ali Bhutto who served as speaker from 14 April 1972 to 15 August 1972 and Yousaf Raza Gillani who served from 17 October 1993 to 16 February 1997. Raja Pervaiz Ashraf, the incumbent Speaker, previously served as Prime Minister from 2012 to 2013.

List of speakers 
List of speakers of the National Assembly

These are the names of speakers and presidents of the National Assembly of Pakistan.

See also
 List of Speakers of the West Pakistan Legislative Assembly
 Senate of Pakistan
 Politics of Pakistan
 Prime Minister of Pakistan 
 Finance Minister of Pakistan
 Constitution of Pakistan

References

National Assembly of Pakistan